The Science, Innovation and Technology is a minister in the New South Wales Government and has responsibilities that includes all schools and institutes of higher education in New South Wales, Australia.

The current minister, since 21 December 2021, is Alister Henskens. The minister supports the Minister for Enterprise, Stuart Ayres.

The ministers manages the portfolio through the Enterprise, Investment and Trade cluster. Ultimately, the ministers are responsible to the Parliament of New South Wales.

There have previously been ministers responsible for Science, Innovation and Technology, however the combined ministry was first created in December 2021 in the second Perrottet ministry.

List of ministers
The following individuals have served as the Minister for Science, Innovation and Technology, or any precedent titles:

Former ministerial titles

Science

Innovation

Technology

See also 

List of New South Wales government agencies

References

Science, Innovation and Technology